Malcolm E Barnes is a former swimmer who competed for England.

Swimming career
He represented England in the 440 yards freestyle and freestyle relay at the 1958 British Empire and Commonwealth Games in Cardiff, Wales.

He was a member of the Stoke Newington Swimming Club.

References

English male swimmers
Swimmers at the 1958 British Empire and Commonwealth Games
Living people
1941 births
Commonwealth Games competitors for England